The Democratic Party (DP) was a political party of South Korea from 1991 to 1995.

History
The party was formed by the merger of New Democratic Unionist Party (NDUP) of Kim Dae-jung, and Democratic Party of Lee Ki-taek (aka Little Democrats), as a part of the opposition union. During that time, NDUP, the main opposition, faced a difficulties after they lost in 1991 local elections. Little Democratic Party, a splinter group formed by the dissidents of Kim Young-sam's United Democratic Party, was struggling with its few seats.

On 16 September 1991, both parties declared to be combined and re-founded as Democratic Party. Both Kim Dae-jung (DJ; Chairman of NDUP) and Lee Ki-taek (KT; Chairman of Little Democrats), was elected as the Co-Presidents of the new party.

Prior to the presidential election in 1992, DJ defeated Lee and elected as the party's presidential candidate. He was widely criticised for calling rural voters as "pro-Democratic Liberal Party (DLP; the then ruling party)" and/or "pro-Roh Tae-woo", and lost to DLP's Kim Young-sam. DJ subsequently resigned his party presidency and retired from the politics. KT then solely elected as the new president on 11 March 1993.

The party then absorbed New Korea Party of Lee Jong-chan in the early 1995, and won the local elections in 1995. However, shortly after, DJ officially returned to politics, and conflicts were sparked. The party's pro-DJ factions, not excluding DJ himself, left and founded a new party, named National Congress for New Politics (NCNP). On 21 December, the party merged with New Party for Reform, and re-built as United Democratic Party, who then became one of the predecessor of the incumbent Liberty Korea Party.

Leadership

Party Presidents

Election results

President

Legislature

Local

References

Defunct political parties in South Korea
Democratic parties in South Korea
Liberal parties
Political parties established in 1991
Political parties disestablished in 1995